Turija may refer to:

Places

Serbia
Turija (Bujanovac)
Turija (Kučevo)
Turija (Srbobran)

Bosnia and Herzegovina
Turija, Bihać
Turija, Konjic
Turija (Lukavac)

Rivers

Serbia
, tributary of the Kolubara

Bosnia and Herzegovina
, tributary of the Spreča

See also
Turiya (river), tributary of the Pripyat, Ukraine
Turiya